Renate Keller (born 25 October 1961) is a Swiss snowboarder. She competed at the 1998 Winter Olympics, in giant slalom.

References 

1961 births
Living people
Swiss female snowboarders
Olympic snowboarders of Switzerland
Snowboarders at the 1998 Winter Olympics